Jefferson County is the most populous county in the U.S. state of Alabama, located in the central portion of the state. As of the 2020 census, its population was 674,721. Its county seat is Birmingham. Its rapid growth as an industrial city in the 20th century, based on heavy manufacturing in steel and iron, established its dominance. Jefferson County is the central county of the Birmingham-Hoover, AL Metropolitan Statistical Area.

History

Jefferson County was established on December 13, 1819, by the Alabama Legislature. It was named in honor of former President Thomas Jefferson. The county is located in the north-central portion of the state, on the southernmost edge of the Appalachian Mountains. It is in the center of the (former) iron, coal, and limestone mining belt of the Southern United States.

Most of the original settlers were migrants of English ancestry from the Carolinas. Early county seats were established first at Carrollsville (1819 – 21), then Elyton (1821 – 73).

Founded around 1871, Birmingham was named for the industrial English city of the same name in Warwickshire. That city had long been a center of iron and steel production in Great Britain. Birmingham was formed by the merger of three towns, including Elyton. It has continued to grow by annexing neighboring towns and villages, including North Birmingham.

As Birmingham industrialized, its growth accelerated, particularly after 1890. It attracted numerous rural migrants, both black and white, for its new jobs. It also attracted European immigrants. Despite the city's rapid growth, for decades it was underrepresented in the legislature. Legislators from rural counties kept control of the legislature and, to avoid losing power, for decades refused to reapportion the seats or redistrict congressional districts. Birmingham could not get its urban needs addressed by the legislature.

Nearby Bessemer, Alabama, located 16 miles by car to the southwest, also grew based on industrialization. It also attracted many workers. By the early decades of the 20th century, it had a majority-black population, but whites dominated politically and economically.

Racial tensions increased in the cities and state in the late 19th century as whites worked to maintain white supremacy. The white-dominated legislature passed a new constitution in 1901 that disenfranchised most blacks and many poor whites, excluding them totally from the political system. While they were nominally still eligible in the mid-20th century for jury duty, they were overwhelmingly excluded by white administrators from juries into the 1950s. Economic competition among the new workers in the city also raised tensions. It was a rough environment of mill and mine workers in Birmingham and Bessemer, and the Ku Klux Klan was active in the 20th century, often with many police being members into the 1950s and 1960s.

In a study of lynchings in the South from 1877 to 1950, Jefferson County is documented as having the highest number of lynchings of any county in Alabama. White mobs committed 29 lynchings in the county, most around the turn of the century at a time of widespread political suppression of blacks in the state. Notable incidents include 1889's lynching of George Meadows.

Even after 1950, racial violence of whites against blacks continued. In the 1950s KKK chapters bombed black-owned houses in Birmingham to discourage residents moving into new middle-class areas. In that period, the city was referred to as "Bombingham."

In 1963 African Americans led a movement in the city seeking civil rights, including integration of public facilities. The Birmingham campaign was known for the violence the city police used against non-violent protesters. In the late summer, city and business officials finally agreed in 1963 to integrate public facilities and hire more African Americans. This followed the civil rights campaign, which was based at the 16th Street Baptist Church, and an economic boycott of white stores that refused to hire blacks. Whites struck again: on a Sunday in September 1963, KKK members bombed the 16th Street Baptist Church, killing four young black girls and injuring many persons. The African-American community quickly rebuilt the damaged church. They entered politics in the city, county and state after the Voting Rights Act of 1965 was passed.

Sewer construction and bond swap controversy
In the 1990s, the county authorized and financed a massive overhaul of the county-owned sewer system, beginning in 1996. Sewerage and water rates had increased more than 300% in the 15 years before 2011, causing severe problems for the poor in Birmingham and the county.

Costs for the project increased due to problems in the financial area. In addition, county officials, encouraged by bribes by financial services companies, made a series of risky bond-swap agreements. Two extremely controversial undertakings by county officials in the 2000s resulted in the county having debt of $4 billion. The county eventually declared bankruptcy in 2011. It was the largest municipal bankruptcy in United States history at that time. Both the sewer project and its financing were scrutinized by federal prosecutors. By 2011, "six of Jefferson County's former commissioners had been found guilty of corruption for accepting the bribes, along with 15 other officials."

The controversial interest rate swaps, initiated in 2002 and 2003 by former Commission President Larry Langford (removed in 2011 as the mayor of Birmingham after his conviction at trial), were intended to lower interest payments. But they had the opposite effect, increasing the county's indebtedness to the point that it had to declare bankruptcy. The bond swaps were the focus of an investigation by the United States Securities and Exchange Commission.

In late February 2008 Standard & Poor's lowered the rating of Jefferson County bonds to "junk" status. The likelihood of the county filing for Chapter 9 bankruptcy protection was debated in the press. In early March 2008, Moody's followed suit and indicated that it would also review the county's ability to meet other bond obligations. On March 7, 2008, Jefferson County failed to post $184 million collateral as required under its sewer bond agreements, thereby moving into technical default.

In February 2011, Lesley Curwen of the BBC World Service interviewed David Carrington, the newly appointed president of the County Commission, about the risk of defaulting on bonds issued to finance "what could be the most expensive sewage system in history." Carrington said there was "no doubt that people from Wall Street offered bribes" and "have to take a huge responsibility for what happened." Wall Street investment banks, including JP Morgan and others, arranged complex financial deals using swaps. The fees and penalty charges increased the cost so the county in 2011 had $3.2 billion outstanding. Carrington said one of the problems was that elected officials had welcomed scheduling with very low early payments so long as peak payments occurred after they left office.

In 2011 the SEC awarded the county $75 million in compensation in relation to a judgment of "unlawful payments" against JP Morgan; in addition the company was penalized by having to forfeit $647 million of future fees.

2011 bankruptcy filing
Jefferson County filed for bankruptcy on November 9, 2011. This action was valued at $4.2 billion, with debts of $3.14 billion relating to sewer work; it was then the most costly municipal bankruptcy ever in the U.S. In 2013 it was surpassed by the Detroit bankruptcy in Michigan. The County requested Chapter 9 relief under federal statute 11 U.S.C. §921. The case was filed in the Northern District of Alabama Bankruptcy Court as case number 11-05736.

, Jefferson County had slashed expenses and reduced employment of county government workers by more than 700. The county emerged from bankruptcy in December 2013, following the approval of a bankruptcy plan by the United States bankruptcy court for the Northern District of Alabama, writing off more than $1.4 billion of the debt.

Geography
It is the fifth-largest county in Alabama by land area.

The county is located within the Ridge-and-Valley Appalachians, with the highest point in the county being found at Shades Mountain, at an elevation of 1,150 ft. Another significant mountain located within the county is Red Mountain, which runs to the south of downtown Birmingham and separates the city from the suburb of Homewood. Many other mountains and valleys make up 
the majority of the county's diverse geography.

The county is home to the Watercress Darter National Wildlife Refuge.

Adjacent counties
 Tuscaloosa County (west)
 Bibb County (southwest)
 Shelby County (south)
 Walker County (northwest)
 Blount County (northeast)
 St. Clair County (northeast)

Demographics

2020

As of the 2020 United States census, there were 674,721 people, 264,753 households, and 164,678 families residing in the county.

2010
Jefferson County population had decreased slightly by 2010.

According to the 2010 United States census, residents of metropolitan Jefferson County identified as the following:
 53.0% White
 42.0% Black
 0.3% Native American
 1.4% Asian
 0.0% Native Hawaiian or Pacific Islander
 1.1% Two or more races
 3.9% Hispanic or Latino (of any race)

2000
As of the census of 2000, there were 662,047 people, 263,265 households, and 175,861 families residing in the county. The racial makeup of the county was 58.10% White, 39.36% Black or African American, 0.21% Native American, 0.90% Asian, 0.03% Pacific Islander, 0.59% from other races, and 0.80% from two or more races. About 1.55% of the population were Hispanic or Latino of any race.

The largest self-reported European ancestries in Jefferson County, Alabama are English 9.7%(64,016), "American" 9.6%(63,015), Irish 8.6%(56,695), German 7.2%(47,690). Many Americans whose ancestors came from Britain or Ireland identify simply as American, because their immigrant ancestors arrived so long ago, in some cases in the 17th and 18th centuries. Demographers estimate that roughly 20–23% of people in Alabama are of predominantly English and related British Isles ancestry. Researchers believe that more of the European-American population has Scots-Irish ancestry than residents identify with today. In addition, many African Americans have mixed-race ancestry, with some ancestors from the British Isles. Having been classified in the South as black under racial segregation, some of these families are beginning to use DNA tests to learn about and acknowledge European ancestors. Some identify as Multiracial as a result.

There were 263,265 households, out of which 30.80% had children under the age of 18 living with them, 46.10% were married couples living together, 17.20% had a female householder with no husband present, and 33.20% were non-families. Nearly 28.70% of all households were made up of individuals, and 9.90% had someone living alone who was 65 years of age or older.  The average household size was 2.45, and the average family size was 3.04.

In the county, the population was spread out, with 24.80% under the age of 18, 9.60% from 18 to 24, 29.70% from 25 to 44, 22.30% from 45 to 64, and 13.60% who were 65 years of age or older.  The median age was 36 years. For every 100 females, there were 89.20 males.  For every 100 females age 18 and over, there were 84.50 males.

In 2007 Jefferson County had the highest rate of syphilis cases per 100,000 in the US, according to data from the Centers for Disease Control and Prevention.

The median income for a household in the county was $36,868, and the median income for a family was $45,951. Males had a median income of $35,954 versus $26,631 for females. The per capita income for the county was $20,892.  About 11.60% of families and 14.80% of the population were below the poverty line, including 20.20% of those under age 18 and 12.70% of those age 65 or over.

Government and infrastructure
Jefferson County is one of the eight counties in Alabama with a limited-form of home rule government. A 1973 Commission had recommended that all counties be granted home rule under the state constitution, but the state legislature has refused to give up its control over local affairs.

In the late nineteenth and twentieth centuries, the county was underrepresented politically for decades into the 1960s because the rural-dominated state legislature refused to redistrict as population increased in urban counties. Changes to county representation in the state legislature did not take place until the state was required to incorporate the principle of one man, one vote from the US Supreme Court decision of Baker v. Carr (1964). It ruled that bicameral legislatures had to have both houses based on population districts, rather than geographic ones. The complexity of Birmingham and Jefferson County urban conditions required more local management, as it was a major industrial center. The county gained some home rule functions by 1944. It allows the county to be set up a zoning system for land use, maintain the sanitary sewer, sewerage systems and highways, provide for garbage and trash disposal, and to enforce taxation (except for property taxes).

Today the county has a type of council-manager form of government. It is governed by a five-member commission that combines the legislative and executive duties for the county. The Commissioners are elected from single-member districts. Each county commissioner represents one of the five districts in the county, apportioned roughly equally by population. By votes in the commission, the commissioners are given executive responsibilities for the various county departments, which fall under the categories of "Roads and Transportation", "Community Development", "Environmental Services", "Health and Human Services", "Technology and Land Development", and "Finance and General Services". The County Commission elects a President from among its members, who serves as the chairperson of all County Commission meetings, and who has additional executive duties.

The Commission hires a county manager, who oversees and directs daily operations of county departments.

Taxation
Sales tax on many items within the county can be as high as 12%. The County Commission approved an educational sales tax by a 3–2 vote in October 2004.  This was implemented In January 2005, as a 1% sales tax to support funding for construction of needed education facilities. This additional 1% has resulted in some county municipalities, such as Fairfield, to have sales tax rates as high as 10%, while other municipalities and incorporated communities had an increase in their total sales tax rate from 8% to 9%.  The state of Alabama sales tax was 4% at the time and Jefferson County's was 2% in total. Some municipal sales taxes reach 4%.

On March 16, 2011, the Alabama Supreme Court ruled that Jefferson County's 2009 occupational tax law was passed unconstitutionally. This decision dealt a devastating financial blow to a county considering bankruptcy.

Law
Jefferson County is served by the Jefferson County Sheriff's Department. The County Sheriff is chosen by the eligible voters in an at large election. The Sheriff's Department fields about 175 deputy sheriffs who patrol the unincorporated areas of the county, and also all municipalities that do not have their own police departments. The Sheriff's Department has two county jails, one in Birmingham and one in Bessemer, which are used to detain suspects awaiting trial (who cannot afford to post bail), and convicted criminals serving sentences less than one year in length.

Two judicial courthouses are located in Jefferson County, a situation dating to when the state legislature was preparing to split off a portion of Jefferson County to create a new county, centered around Bessemer. The city is located about 16 miles to the southwest by car. The split did not take place because the area of the proposed county would have been smaller than the minimum of 500 square miles set forth in the state constitution.  The additional county courthouse and some parallel functions remain in service. The main courthouse is in Birmingham and the second one is located in Bessemer. Certain elected county officials maintain offices in the Bessemer annex, such as the Assistant Tax Collector, the Assistant Tax Assessor, and the Assistant District Attorney.

Prisons
The local jails have a long history of abuse of prisoners. One former jailer, who started work for the Jefferson County Convict Department in 1919, described beatings, the administration of laxatives, and confinement in a tiny two-by-three-foot cell, as well as beatings with rubber hoses. He said, "You can work a man pretty good with a piece of pipe and never mark him." Well into the 1950s, prisoners were regularly beaten and tortured by police to extract coerced "confessions" to crimes.

In mid-2015, the Department of Justice announced an investigation of the conditions imposed on juveniles in the county jail. It said that young people with mental illnesses were locked in solitary confinement for months at a time. Others were housed with adult prisoners who raped them.

The Alabama Department of Corrections operates the William E. Donaldson Correctional Facility, a prison for men, in unincorporated Jefferson County near Bessemer. The prison includes one of the two Alabama death rows for men.

Religion
In 2010 statistics, the largest religious group in Jefferson County was the SBC Baptists with 185,650 members in 272 congregations, followed by 69,878 non-denominational adherents with 170 congregations, 67,313 NBC Baptists with 117 congregations, 55,083 Catholics in the Roman Catholic Diocese of Birmingham in Alabama with 32 parishes, 43,422 UMC Methodists with 86 congregations, 15,899 CoG–Cleveland, Tennessee Pentecostals with 45 congregations, 14,025 TEC Episcopalians with 17 congregations, 11,267 CoC Christians with 69 congregations, 11,171 CoGiC Pentecostals with 16 congregations, and 9,472 AME Methodists with 42 congregations. Altogether, 83.9% of the population was claimed as members by religious congregations, although members of historically African-American denominations were underrepresented due to incomplete information. In 2014, Jefferson County had 714 religious organizations, the 15th most out of all US counties.

Education
School districts in the county include:

 Bessemer City School District
 Birmingham City School District
 Fairfield City School District
 Homewood City School District
 Hoover City School District
 Leeds City School District
 Jefferson County School District
 Midfield City School District
 Mountain Brook City School District
 Tarrant City School District
 Trussville City School District
 Vestavia Hills City School District

History of education
As a reaction to the US Supreme Court's ruling in Brown v Board of Education in 1954, that segregated public schools were unconstitutional, both state and local officials took steps to preserve de facto educational segregation. As late as 1965, schools in the county were still totally segregated. In 1969, public schools in the county became fully integrated.

Except for cities such as Birmingham, that have established their own local school districts, all parts of Jefferson County are served by the Jefferson County Board of Education. Parts within Birmingham are served by Birmingham City Schools.

Beginning in 1959, more wealthy towns, with predominately white populations, began to form their own school systems. Critics allege this served to stymie integration and financially starve schools that served mostly black populations. Cities in the county that have established their own school systems are Gardendale, Bessemer, Fairfield, Midfield, Trussville, Homewood, Leeds, Hoover, Vestavia Hills, Tarrant, and Mountain Brook. The pattern of residential and economic segregation has occurred in many parts of the country, including economic segregation of poorer whites.

Politics
In 2008, Barack Obama carried Jefferson County with 166,121 votes (52.2 percent), although the state voted for Republican candidate Senator John McCain by a double-digit majority. Obama carried the industrial, urbanized county by a larger majority in 2012, winning with 52.5 percent. Democratic candidate Hillary Clinton also carried the county in 2016, with a majority of 51.5 percent. In 2020, Joe Biden received 55.7% of the vote in Jefferson County, the best performance by a Democrat since Franklin Roosevelt in 1944.

Before Obama's victory, Jefferson County had last supported the official Democratic candidate for president in 1952, and only once since 1944.

Transportation

Major highways

  Interstate 20
  Interstate 22
  Interstate 59
  Interstate 65
  Future Interstate 222
  Future Interstate 422
  Interstate 459
  U.S. Route 11
  U.S. Route 31
  U.S. Route 78
  U.S. Route 280
  U.S. Route 411
  State Route 5
  State Route 25
  State Route 75
  State Route 79
  State Route 119
  State Route 149
  State Route 150
  State Route 151
  State Route 269
  State Route 378

Railroads
Amtrak passenger service is provided by the Crescent, which stops in Birmingham. Freight service is provided by BNSF Railway, CSX Transportation, Norfolk Southern Railway, Alabama & Tennessee River Railway and Birmingham Terminal Railway (formerly Birmingham Southern Railroad). There is also one switching and terminal railroad, Alabama Warrior Railway.

Air travel
Birmingham is the location of the Birmingham-Shuttlesworth International Airport, which provides service, either direct or connecting, to most of the rest of the United States.

Communities

Cities

 Adamsville
 Bessemer
 Birmingham (county seat; partly in Shelby County)
 Brighton
 Center Point
 Clay
 Fairfield
 Fultondale
 Gardendale
 Graysville
 Helena (mostly in Shelby County)
 Homewood
 Hoover (partly in Shelby County)
 Hueytown
 Irondale
 Kimberly
 Leeds (partly in Shelby County and St. Clair County)
 Lipscomb
 Mountain Brook
 Pinson
 Pleasant Grove
 Sumiton (partly in Walker County)
 Tarrant
 Trussville (partly in St. Clair County)
 Vestavia Hills (partly in Shelby County)
 Warrior (partly in Blount County)

Towns

 Argo (partly in St. Clair County)
 Brookside
 Cardiff
 County Line (partly in Blount County)
 Maytown
 Midfield
 Morris
 Mulga
 North Johns
 Sylvan Springs
 Trafford
 West Jefferson

Census-designated places

 Chalkville (former; annexed by city of Clay)
 Concord
 Edgewater
 Forestdale
 Grayson Valley
 McCalla
 McDonald Chapel
 Minor
 Mount Olive
 Rock Creek

Unincorporated communities

 Adger
 Alton
 Bayview
 Bagley
 Bradford
 Coalburg
 Corner
 Crumley Chapel
 Docena
 Dolomite
 Flat Top
 Hopewell
 Kimbrell
 New Castle
 Palmerdale (Neighborhood of Pinson, Alabama)
 Robbins Crossroads
 Sayre
 Shannon
 Watson

Former towns

 Acipcoville, (former community, now a neighborhood in Birmingham)
 Elyton (former Jefferson County Seat, now a neighborhood in Birmingham)
 Ensley (former town, now a neighborhood in Birmingham)
 North Birmingham, (former city, now a neighborhood in Birmingham)
 Woodlawn, (former city, now a neighborhood in Birmingham)

See also
Jefferson County Library Cooperative
 National Register of Historic Places listings in Jefferson County, Alabama

References
Specific

General

 "Looting Main Street: How the nation's biggest banks are ripping off American cities with the same predatory deals that brought down Greece", Rolling Stone March 31, 2010
 The Sewer of Gold and other famous crooks from frtillman.net

External links
 Official website
 Jefferson County Department of Health
 Jefferson County Department of Education
 Jefferson County Library System
 Jefferson County Sheriff's Department
 Jefferson County Historical Commission
 West Jefferson County Historical Society
 Jefferson County Historical Association

 
Alabama counties
1819 establishments in Alabama
Birmingham metropolitan area, Alabama
Counties of Appalachia
Government units that have filed for Chapter 9 bankruptcy
Populated places established in 1819
Majority-minority counties in Alabama